(It has been told to you, man, what is good), 45 is a church cantata by Johann Sebastian Bach. He composed it in Leipzig for the eighth Sunday after Trinity and first performed it on 11 August 1726.

History and words 

Bach composed the cantata in Leipzig for the Eighth Sunday after Trinity. It is part of his third cantata cycle.

The prescribed readings for the Sunday are from the Epistle to the Romans, "For as many as are led by the Spirit of God, they are the sons of God", and from the Gospel of Matthew, the warning of false prophets from the Sermon on the Mount. The text is attributed to Ernst Ludwig, Duke of Saxe-Meiningen, published in a 1705 collection. The poet chose for the opening a verse of the prophet Micah, "He hath shewed thee, O man, what is good; and what doth the Lord require of thee, but to do justly, and to love mercy, and to walk humbly with thy God?", which is related to the famous saying of Jesus "Ye shall know them by their fruits", and "but he that doeth the will of my Father" from the Gospel. The central movement, opening the second part (marked ) to be performed after the sermon, is a quotation of verse 22 from the Gospel, "Many will say to me in that day, Lord, Lord, have we not prophesied in thy name? and in thy name have cast out devils? and in thy name done many wonderful works?". The cantata is closed by the second stanza of Johann Heermann's hymn "O Gott, du frommer Gott" (1630). The cantata is a symmetrical structure around the central Gospel quotation, beginning with the Old Testament and leading to the chorale.

Bach first performed the cantata on 11 August 1726.

Scoring and structure 

The cantata in seven movements is scored for three vocal soloists (alto, tenor, and bass), a four-part choir, two flauti traversi, two oboes, two violins, viola and basso continuo.

Music 

The opening chorus is a complex structure, beginning with an extended instrumental section, then alternating fugal sections with others in which the vocal parts are embedded in the orchestral concerto.  The tenor aria, preceded by secco recitative, is of a dance-like character and is accompanied by the strings.

Bach marks it Arioso and has the strings play in vivid movement, to passionately emphasize the words. The strings open the movement and repeat that music four times in different keys, the bass part shows bold leaps and rich coloraturas. John Eliot Gardiner observes:

The figuration is similar in the following alto aria, but mellow in the solo flute with continuo, matching the consoling words. Another secco recitative introduces the closing chorale on a melody by Ahasverus Fritsch, set in four parts.

Recordings 

 Bach Cantatas Vol. 4 – Sundays after Trinity I, Karl Richter, Münchener Bach-Chor, Münchener Bach-Orchester, Hertha Töpper, Ernst Haefliger, Kieth Engen, Archiv Produktion 1959
 J. S. Bach: Cantatas No. 105 & No. 45, Ernest Ansermet, Chœur Pro Arte de Lausanne, L'Orchestre de la Suisse Romande, Helen Watts, Ian Partridge, Tom Krause, Decca 1966
 J. S. Bach: Kantaten BWV 45, BWV 176, Helmuth Rilling, Gächinger Kantorei, Bach-Collegium Stuttgart, Norma Procter, Kurt Equiluz, Erich Wenk, Cantate 1967
 J. S. Bach: Das Kantatenwerk – Sacred Cantatas Vol. 3, Gustav Leonhardt, Knabenchor Hannover, Leonhardt-Consort, René Jacobs, Kurt Equiluz, Hanns-Friedrich Kunz, Teldec 1974
 Die Bach Kantate Vol. 45, Helmuth Rilling, Gächinger Kantorei, Bach-Collegium Stuttgart, Julia Hamari, Aldo Baldin, Philippe Huttenlocher, Hänssler 1982
 Bach Edition Vol. 9 – Cantatas Vol. 4, conductor Pieter Jan Leusink, Holland Boys Choir, Netherlands Bach Collegium, Sytse Buwalda, Knut Schoch, Bas Ramselaar, Brilliant Classics 1999
 Bach Cantatas Vol. 5: Rendsburg/Braunschweig / For the 8th Sunday after Trinity, John Eliot Gardiner, Monteverdi Choir, English Baroque Soloists, Robin Tyson, Christoph Genz, Brindley Sherratt, Archiv Produktion 2000
 J. S. Bach: Complete Cantatas Vol. 18, Ton Koopman, Amsterdam Baroque Orchestra & Choir, Bogna Bartosz, Christoph Prégardien, Klaus Mertens, Antoine Marchand 2002
 J. S. Bach: Cantatas Vol. 46 – Cantatas from Leipzig 1724, Masaaki Suzuki, Bach Collegium Japan, Robin Blaze, Gerd Türk, Peter Kooy, BIS 2009

References

Sources 
 
 
 Es ist dir gesagt, Mensch, was gut ist BWV 45; BC A 113 / Sacred cantata (8th Sunday after Trinity) Bach Digital
 Cantata BWV 45 Es ist dir gesagt, Mensch, was gut ist history, scoring, sources for text and music, translations to various languages, discography, discussion, Bach Cantatas Website
 BWV 45 Es ist dir gesagt, Mensch, was gut ist English translation, University of Vermont
 BWV 45 Es ist dir gesagt, Mensch, was gut ist text, scoring, University of Alberta
 Chapter 21 Bwv 45 – The Cantatas of Johann Sebastian Bach Julian Mincham, 2010
 Luke Dahn: BWV 45.7 bach-chorales.com

Church cantatas by Johann Sebastian Bach
1726 compositions